The Seamstress can refer to:
 The Seamstress (composition), a 2014 violin concerto by composer Anna Clyne
 The Seamstress (1936 film), a 1936 Czech film
 The Seamstress (2009 film), a 2009 Canadian film
 The Seamstress (painting), an 1893 oil painting by French artist Édouard Vuillard
 The seamstress (A Tale of Two Cities), a fictional character in Charles Dickens's A Tale of Two Cities